The 2018 Women's Bandy World Championship was held in China, in the city of Chengde on 9–13 January 2018. This was the IXth Women's Bandy World Championship.

While the record number of participants in previous tournaments is 7, the organisers had thought out measures with the goal to attract 12 participating countries. However, in the end the number of teams were 8, including the debutants Estonia and Switzerland, while Canada declined this year. The matches were played on naturally frozen ice on the lake at Chengde Mountain Resort.

Sweden and Russia met for the ninth time of nine possible in the final. For the eighth time Sweden won.

Venue

Squads

Group stage 
All times are local (UTC+8).

Group A

Group B

Knock-out stage

Bracket

Qualifying match

7th place match

5th place match

Semifinals

Third place match

Final

Final ranking

Tournament awards 
 MVP:  Matilda Svenler
 Best goalkeeper:  Linda Odén
 Best defender:  Anna Widing
 Best midfielder:  Olga Bogdanova
 Best forward:  Olga Rodionova

References

External links
 Official website

World
2018 in Chinese sport
International bandy competitions hosted by China
2018
January 2018 sports events in China
Chengde